Douglas "Doug" Turner (born 2 December 1966) is a British former track and field sprinter who competed mainly in the 200 metres. He was the silver medallist at the 1998 European Athletics Championships. His personal best for the 200 m was 20.43 seconds, set in 1996. He also represented Great Britain at the 1999 World Championships in Athletics and Wales at the Commonwealth Games in 1998 and 2002.

Career
Born in Newport, Wales, he was a late starter and made his debut at a major outdoor international competition in his thirties. He ran in the heats only at the 1996 European Athletics Indoor Championships and 1997 IAAF World Indoor Championships. He came to prominence during a period of strong sprint competition in Wales, with Christian Malcolm, Jamie Baulch and Tim Benjamin among his contemporaries. Both he and Malcolm were members of Cardiff Amateur Athletic Club and worked with coach Jock Anderson.

At the national level, Turner won the 200 m Welsh title on three occasions, having back-to-back wins in 1995 and 1996 before taking his final title in 2001. His winning time of 20.54 seconds in 2001 was a record for the meet. He was also twice a 200 m winner at the AAA Indoor Championships, topping the podium in 1996 and 2002. He achieved his personal best of 20.43 seconds in 1996. He managed fifth for Great Britain at the 1998 IAAF World Cup, recording a time of 20.51 seconds, but failed to get past the semi-finals at the 1998 Commonwealth Games. At that competition he was part of the 4 × 100 metres relay team and placed fourth in a team of Malcolm, James Henthorn, and Kevin Williams.

The 1998 season proved to be the high point of his career. First he placed fifth at the 1998 European Athletics Indoor Championships. Following this he won his only major international medal in the 200 m final at the 1998 European Athletics Championships, taking the silver medal as part of a British medal sweep alongside winner Douglas Walker and Julian Golding.

Turner ran at the 1999 World Championships in Athletics, but failed to make the final. His final year of competition came in 2002, when he ran in the 200 m heats at the 2002 European Athletics Indoor Championships and was a semi-finalist at the 2002 Commonwealth Games. Following these performances, and his advancing years, the national sports body Elite Cmyru dropped him from their funding programme, which brought about his retirement from the sport.

He received a three-month doping ban after a positive test for ephedrine in 2000. This also brought about an Olympic ban by the British Olympic Association, but an appeal to the body overturned the ban on the basis that only small traces were found in his system and that the consumption of the drug was unintentional.

Personal bests
100 metres – 10.37 (2001)
200 metres – 20.43 (1996)
60 metres (indoor) – 6.69 (2002)
200 metres (indoor) – 20.59 (2002)

National titles
Welsh Athletics Championships
200 m: 1995, 1996, 2001
AAA Indoor Championships
200 m: 1996, 2002

International competitions

See also
List of European Athletics Championships medalists (men)

References

External links

Living people
1966 births
Sportspeople from Newport, Wales
Welsh male sprinters
Commonwealth Games competitors for Wales
Athletes (track and field) at the 1998 Commonwealth Games
Athletes (track and field) at the 2002 Commonwealth Games
World Athletics Championships athletes for Great Britain
Welsh sportspeople in doping cases
Doping cases in athletics
European Athletics Championships medalists